Boydtown is an unincorporated community in the towns of Marietta and Wauzeka, Crawford County, Wisconsin, United States. The community was named by and for Robert Boyd, who laid out the community in 1844 with the expectation of a railroad being built through the area.

References

Unincorporated communities in Crawford County, Wisconsin
Unincorporated communities in Wisconsin